Iván Darío López (August 25, 1980 in Bogotá, Colombia), is a Colombian television actor. He is best known for his telenovelas.

Filmography

Film

Television roles

Awards and nominations

References

External links 
 

1980 births
Colombian male telenovela actors
Colombian male television actors
21st-century Colombian male actors
Living people